The Toyota TF106/TF106B is a Formula One car developed and engineered by Toyota for competing in the 2006 Formula One season. The chassis was designed by Mike Gascoyne, John Litjens and Nicoló Petrucci with the engine being designed by Luca Marmorini. The car is an evolution of the previous year's TF105. The team began testing the car in November 2005, months earlier than any other team.

2006 season
After a highly successful 2005 season, hopes were high that Toyota would be a force in the 2006 season. However, from the off it was clear that this was not to be. In Bahrain, neither driver made it through to the pole position shoot-out, indeed Ralf Schumacher failed even to make the second round. This bad form continued for some months with the only highlight being Ralf's podium in Australia, which remained the team's best result that season. At Monaco a B version of the car was introduced but the effect was not immediate and it was not until Canada that Jarno Trulli scored his first points of the season. Toyota finished the standings in 6th place with 35 points, 2 spots lower than in 2005, when they scored 88 points.

Complete Formula One results
(key) (results in bold indicate pole position)

External links

  Official Website

Toyota Formula One cars
2006 Formula One season cars